Langrial may refer to:

Langrial (Abbottabad district), a village in Khyber Pakhtunkhwa
Langrial (Gujrat district), a village in Punjab, Pakistan
Langrian, a village in Punjab, India
Langrial clan, a tribe of Jatt and Rajput people
Nauman Ahmad Langrial, Pakistani Politician